Kaisariani is a suburb and a municipality in the eastern part of the Athens agglomeration in Greece.

Geography

The municipality has an area of 7.841 km2. Towards the east the municipality extends to the forested Hymettus mountain, where the 11th century Kaisariani Monastery is situated. The built-up area of Kaisariani is continuous with that of the center of Athens and the suburb Vyronas to the southwest. The main thoroughfare is Ethnikis Antistasis Avenue, which connects Kaisariani with the center of Athens and the eastern beltway Motorway 64.

History
The town was founded in 1922 as a refugee camp for refugees driven from Asia Minor, most of whom coming from Smyrna.
Formerly part of the municipality of Athens, Kaisariani was created as a municipality in 1933. The name was derived from Caesarea, the historical capital city of Cappadocia, Asia Minor (now Kayseri, Turkey).

The Kaisariani rifle range is notable as the site of the execution of 200 communists on 1 May 1944 by the Nazi occupiers as a revenge for the death of German general Franz Krech, who had been killed in a guerrilla ambush near Molaoi a few days before.

In the early hours of June 17, 1944, 10 men of the United Panhellenic Organization of Youth and guerillas of the National Liberation Front were killed, when trapped by the Nazi forces at the Monastery of Kaisariani, where they had been hiding.

Historical population

Sports
Kaisariani has its own Greek A2 League basketball team, named Near East Kaisariani, which was founded in 1927. The team plays in the Near East Indoor Arena.

Notable people 
Themis Adamantidis, singer
Christos Dantis, singer and songwriter
Anna Fonsou, actress
Stelios Giannakopoulos, footballer
Antonis Kalogiannis, singer
Evangelos Kouloumbis, politician
Domna Samiou, musician

See also
List of municipalities of Attica

References

External links
Photos of Kaisariani
City of Kaisariani official website
Kesariani Online
Kaisariani Theatre

1922 establishments in Greece
Populated places established in 1922
Municipalities of Attica
Populated places in Central Athens (regional unit)